Clube de Futebol Esperança de Lagos (abbreviated as CF Esperança de Lagos or CF Esperança Lagos) is a Portuguese football club based in Lagos in the Algarve.

Background
CF Esperança de Lagos currently plays in the Campeonato de Portugal, which is the fourth tier of Portuguese football. The club was founded in 1912 and they play their home matches at the Municipal de Lagos in Lagos.

The club is affiliated to Associação de Futebol do Algarve and has competed in the AF Algarve Taça.  The club has also entered the national cup competition known as Taça de Portugal on many occasions.

Current squad

Season to season

Honours
Terceira Divisão: 1982–83
AF Algarve 1ª Divisão: 2008–09

Notable former managers
 Fernando Cabrita

Footnotes

External links
Official website 

Football clubs in Portugal
Association football clubs established in 1912
1912 establishments in Portugal
Sport in Lagos, Portugal